Vivre can refer to:

Vivre (album), a 1988 album by Celine Dion
"Vivre" (Carole Vinci song), the Swiss entry to the Eurovision Song Contest 1978
"Vivre" (Guy Bonnet song), the French entry to the Eurovision Song Contest 1983
"Vivre" (Noa song), a 1998 French song from the musical Notre Dame de Paris, covered in 1999 in English by Celine Dion